The Woolwich pub bombing was an attack by the Provisional Irish Republican Army in Woolwich, a district of London in the United Kingdom, as part of The Troubles.

Echoing similar attacks in Guildford the previous month, a bomb made of 6 lb of gelignite with the addition of shrapnel was thrown through the window into the Kings Arms pub on 7 November 1974. Two people were killed in the explosion: Gunner Richard Dunne (aged 42), of the Royal Artillery (the Barracks is just 100 yards away), and Alan Horsley (aged 20), a sales clerk. A further 35 people, including the landlady, Margaret Nash, were injured.

Initially a left-wing extremist group called Red Flag 74 said it had placed the bomb, but responsibility was subsequently claimed by the Provisional Irish Republican Army (IRA) and specifically by part of the group apprehended at the Balcombe Street Siege. Some of the Guildford Four were wrongfully charged with involvement in this bombing.

The Royal Artillery barracks was bombed by the IRA in December 1983.

See also 
 Birmingham pub bombings
 Guildford pub bombings

References 

Terrorist incidents in the United Kingdom in 1974
Provisional IRA bombings in London
Woolwich
Attacks on bars in the United Kingdom
Building bombings in London
1974 in London